Chremistica is a genus of cicadas from Southeast Asia and Madagascar. Its distribution encompasses India, Sri Lanka, continental South East Asia, Taiwan, Philippines, Malayan Peninsula, Sumatra, Borneo and Java, the Lesser Sunda Islands, viz., Lombok, Sumba, Sumbawa and Timor, and Sulawesi, while one group of species is recorded from Madagascar

List of species
Chremistica biloba Bregman, 1985
Chremistica bimaculata (Olivier, 1790)
Chremistica borneensis Yaakop, Duffels and Visser, 2005
Chremistica brooksi Yaakop, Duffels and Visser, 2005
Chremistica echinaria Yaakop and Duffels, 2005
Chremistica guamusangensis Salmah and Zaidi, 2002
Chremistica hollowayi Yaakop, Duffels and Visser, 2005
Chremistica kecil Salmah and Zaidi, 2002
Chremistica malayensis Yaakop, Duffels and Visser, 2005
Chremistica minor Bregman, 1985
Chremistica nesiotes Breddin, 1905
Chremistica niasica Yaakop, Duffels and Visser, 2005
Chremistica ochracea (Walker, 1850)
Chremistica pontianaka (Distant, 1888)
Chremistica sumatrana Yaakop, Duffels and Visser, 2005
Chremistica tagalica Stål, 1870
Chremistica tridentigera Breddin, 1905
Chremistica umbrosa (Distant, 1904)

References

Arthropods of Africa
Arthropods of Asia
Cryptotympanini
Cicadidae genera
Taxa named by Carl Stål